Jan Rutta (born July 29, 1990) is a Czech professional ice hockey defenceman for the Pittsburgh Penguins of the National Hockey League (NHL). Rutta won back-to-back Stanley Cups with the Lightning in 2020 and 2021.

Playing career
Rutta made his Czech Extraliga debut playing with Piráti Chomutov debut during the 2012–13 Czech Extraliga season.

After seven seasons with Chomutov, Rutta left the Czech Republic in signing a one-year contract with the Chicago Blackhawks of the NHL on June 8, 2017. After attending his first training camp with the Blackhawks, Rutta made the opening night roster for the 2017–18 season. On October 9, 2017, Rutta scored his first NHL goal against goaltender Frederik Andersen in a game against the Toronto Maple Leafs. Rutta secured a blueline role within the Blackhawks during the season, and on March 8, 2018 was signed to a one-year $2.25 million extension. With the Blackhawks missing the post-season, Rutta appeared in 57 games while adding offensively with 6 goals and 14 assists for 20 points.

In the following the 2018–19 season, with the Blackhawks continuing to struggle out of the gate, Rutta was placed on waivers after contributing with 2 goals and 6 points in 23 games on December 23, 2018. After clearing he was assigned to AHL affiliate, the Rockford IceHogs. On January 11, 2019, Rutta was traded by the Blackhawks, along with a 2019 seventh-round pick to the Tampa Bay Lightning in exchange for Slater Koekkoek and a 2019 fifth-round pick. He was slated to continue in the AHL with the Lightning's affiliate, the Syracuse Crunch. On March 3, 2019, Rutta made his debut with the Lightning in a 3–2 win over the Detroit Red Wings at Amalie Arena. He played out the tail end of the regular season with the League leading Lightning, posting 2 assists in 14 games. He maintained his place in the lineup through the playoffs, recording 2 assists in a 4 game series sweep defeat to the Columbus Blue Jackets.

On May 4, 2019, Rutta was re-signed to a one-year, $1.3 million contract extension to continue with the Lightning.

During the 2020–21 season, on June 15, 2021, Rutta scored his first career NHL playoff goal in the Lightning's 4–2 win against the New York Islanders.

Following four seasons within the Lightning organization, Rutta left as a free agent and was signed to a three-year, $8.25 million contract with the Pittsburgh Penguins on 13 July 2022.

Career statistics

Regular season and playoffs

International

Awards and honors

References

External links
 

1990 births
Living people
Chicago Blackhawks players
Czech ice hockey defencemen
Piráti Chomutov players
Pittsburgh Penguins players
Rockford IceHogs (AHL) players
Sportspeople from Písek
Stanley Cup champions
Syracuse Crunch players
Tampa Bay Lightning players
Undrafted National Hockey League players
Czech expatriate ice hockey players in the United States
Sportovní Klub Kadaň players